Winters Joint Unified School District is a school district in Winters, California, United States. It served just over 1,800 students in 2008.

References

External links 
Winters Joint Unified School District homepage

School districts in Yolo County, California
Winters, California
1891 establishments in California
School districts established in 1891